Ciliopagurus albatrossi is a species of hermit crab native to the Hawaiian region.

References

Hermit crabs
Crustaceans described in 1995